Richard Thomas "Dick" Mulcahey was an American politician and educator who served as a Democratic member of the Illinois House of Representatives from 1975 until 1993.

Biography
Richard Thomas Mulcahey was born March 22, 1935, in Rockford, Illinois. He earned a bachelor of science degree with a history major

from Wisconsin State University and later did graduate work at the University of Illinois. Mulachey served in the United States Marine Corps from 1954 to 1956 with the 1st Marine Division. He then became a teacher and taught at schools in Galena and Durand.

In 1974, Mulcahey was elected to the Illinois House of Representatives along with Democratic incumbent Robert E. Brinkmeier and Republican Harlan Rigney. In 1982, after the passage of the Cutback Amendment eliminated multi-member House districts, Mulachey was elected to represent the 69th district, which included all of Jo Daviess and Stephenson counties along with western Winnebago County. During the 1980s, Mulcahey chaired the Education Committee.

In 1992, the Republican controlled redistricting committee renumbered the district the 74th and drew it to include all of Jo Daviess and Stephenson counties along with portions of Carroll, Ogle, and Whiteside counties. Mulcahey initially planned to retire and lost re-election to Ron Lawfer, a Republican member of the Jo Daviess County Board, after changing those plans and running for reelection.

References

1935 births
Living people
20th-century American politicians
Democratic Party members of the Illinois House of Representatives
People from Jo Daviess County, Illinois
Educators from Illinois
Military personnel from Illinois
University of Illinois alumni
University of Wisconsin–Madison College of Letters and Science alumni